Abraham Venable may refer to:
Abraham B. Venable (1758–1811), U.S. Congressman and senator from Virginia
Abraham Watkins Venable (1799–1876), U.S. and Confederate Congressman from North Carolina

See also
 Venable, persons sharing the surname